"I'm Better" is a song by American recording artist Missy Elliott, and features accompanying vocals by frequent production partner Lamb.

Critical reception
In a retrospetive review of the song, Steven J. Horowitz fom Vulture found that with "I'm Better" Elliott "reemerged with what could have been a triumphant single, but it didn’t feel entirely natural to her style. Flush with sirens and tip-toeing synths, "I’m Better" loses its footing with its trap-inspired meter – more Migos than Missy."

Music video
The video was co-directed by Elliott and Dave Meyers. Elliot noted that she had the video in mind upon listening to the track. The video took a month to rehearse owing to Elliott's wish to make it "look like art instead of just a video" and for the choreography to be "challenging". Rolling Stone noted the video "builds on Elliott's future-forward off-kilter aesthetic", also stating that it "nods as much to sci-fi as classic, Hype Williams-era hip-hop videos". Further praise from Billboard, stating the music video is a "stylized, can’t-look-away clip", and noted the "aquatic sequence is an unexpected trip".

Remix
An official remix of "I'm Better" was released in May 2017. The remix featured Eve, Lil' Kim, and Trina.

Track listings
 "I'm Better" (featuring Lamb) – 3:33
 "I'm Better" (Remix) (featuring Eve, Lil Kim and Trina) – 4:29

Charts

Release history

References

External links

2017 singles
2017 songs
Missy Elliott songs
Music videos directed by Dave Meyers (director)
Song recordings produced by Pharrell Williams
Songs written by Missy Elliott
Atlantic Records singles
The Goldmind Inc. singles
Songs written by Cainon Lamb